Hochreither is a surname of German origin. People with that name include:

 Joseph Balthasar Hochreither (1669-1731), Austrian organist and composer
 Karl Hochreither (1933-2018), German organist, conductor, music educator and musicologist

See also
 Sepp Hochreiter (born 1967), German computer scientist
 

Surnames of German origin